River View is a subdivision of Valley, Alabama on the Chattahoochee River.  On May 20, 1980, the communities of Shawmut, Langdale, Fairfax, and River View merged to form the city of Valley.  It is the location of Riverview Historic District, which is listed on the U.S. National Register of Historic Places.

References

External links

Geography of Chambers County, Alabama
Alabama populated places on the Chattahoochee River